Cross-cutting is an editing technique most often used in films to establish action occurring at the same time, and often in the same place. In a cross-cut, the camera will cut away from one action to another action, which can suggest the simultaneity of these two actions, but this is not always the case. Cross-cutting can also be used for characters in a film with the same goals but different ways of achieving them.

Suspense may be added by cross-cutting. It is built through the expectations that it creates and in the hopes that it will be explained with time. Cross-cutting also forms parallels; it illustrates a narrative action that happens in several places at approximately the same time. For instance, in D. W. Griffith's A Corner in Wheat (1909), the film cross-cuts between the activities of rich businessmen and poor people waiting in line for bread. This creates a sharp dichotomy between the two actions, and encourages the viewer to compare the two shots. Often, this contrast is used for strong emotional effect, and frequently at the climax of a film. The rhythm of, or length of time between, cross-cuts can also set the rhythm of a scene. Increasing the rapidity between two different actions may add tension to a scene, much in the same manner as using short, declarative sentences in a work of literature.

Cross-cutting was established as a film-making technique relatively early in film history (two examples being Edwin Porter's 1903 short The Great Train Robbery and Louis J. Gasnier's 1908 short The Runaway Horse); Griffith was its most famous practitioner. The technique is showcased in his Biograph work, such as A Corner in Wheat and 1911's The Lonedale Operator. His 1915 film The Birth of a Nation contains textbook examples of cross-cutting and firmly established it as a staple of film editing. Mrinal Sen has used cross-cutting effectively in his agit-prop film Interview, which achieved significant commercial success. Christopher Nolan uses cross-cutting extensively in films such as Interstellar, The Dark Knight and Inception — particularly in the latter, in which sequences depict multiple simultaneous levels of consciousness. Cloud Atlas is known for its numerous cross-cuts between the film's six different stories, some lasting only a few seconds yet spanning across hundreds of years in different locations around the world. Its cuts are eased by the similar emotional tone depicted by each side's action.

Cross-cutting is often used during phone-conversation sequences so that viewers see both characters' facial expressions in response to what is said.

See also
 Buffer shot
 Cutaway (filmmaking)
 Dissolve (filmmaking)
 Fast cutting
 Jump cut
 Match cut
 Shot reverse shot
 Slow cutting

Notes

References

Cinematography
Cinematic techniques
Film editing